Vincenzo Cardarelli, pseudonym of Nazareno Caldarelli (1 May 1887 – 18 June 1959) was an Italian poet and journalist.

Cardarelli was born in Corneto, Lazio, in a family of Marche origin.  His father was Antonio Romagnoli. His studies were irregular and he applied to different jobs. In 1906, when he had moved to Rome, he began his career as a journalist.

He created, in 1919 with Riccardo Bacchelli and Emilio Cecchi, the prestigious review La Ronda (1919-1922). He was one of the contributors of the Fascist daily Il Tevere. 

He won two literary awards, including the 1929 Premio Bagutta for Il Sole a picco and the 1948 Premio Strega for Villa Tarantola.

Works
 Prologhi (1916)
 Viaggi nel tempo (1920)
 Terra genitrice (1924)
 Favole e memorie (1925)
 Il sole a picco (1929), Premio Bagutta winner
 Prologhi viaggi, favole (1929)
 Giorni in piena (1934)
 
 Poesie (Poetry) (1936)
 Il cielo sulle città (1939)
 Rimorsi (Remorse) (1944)
 Lettere non spedite (1946)
 Poesie nuove (New Poetry) (1946)
 Solitario in Arcadia (Alone in Arcadia) (1947)
 Villa Tarantola (1948), Premio Strega winner
 Poesie (Poetry) (1949)
 Opere complete (Complete Works) (1962)
 Invettiva ed altre poesie disperse (1964)
 Opere (Works) (a cura di Clelia Martignoni,Milano,1981)
 Autunno, sei vecchio, rassegnati (1988)
 Gabbiani, a cura Mondadori (1998)
 Estate (2008)

References

 Alessandro Baruffi: Vincenzo Cardarelli: The Forgotten amongst the Great: A Collection of the Best Poems Translated in English, LiteraryJoint Press, Philadelphia, PA, 2016
 Daniele D'Alterio: Vincenzo Cardarelli sindacalista rivoluzionario : politica e letteratura in Italia nel primo Novecento, Bulzoni : Rom 2005
 Carmine Di Biase: Invito alla lettura di Vincenzo Cardarelli, 1986
 Charles Burdett: Vincenzo Cardarelli and His Contemporaries: Fascist Politics and Literary Culture (Oxford Modern Languages and Literature Monographs), Oxford University Press 1999, 
 Italienische Lyrik. 50 Gedichte. Ital./Dt. Übers. u. Hrsg.: Jürgen Freiherr von Stackelberg, Reclam 
 Giuseppe Savoca: Concordanza delle poesie di Vincenzo Cardarelli, Olschki : Florenz 1987, 
 Pia-Elisabeth Leuschner, Vincenzo Cardarelli: „Settembre a Venezia / September in Venedig, in: Italienisch. Zeitschrift für italienische Sprache und Literatur, Bd. 48, November 2002, S. 66ff.
 H. Meter: Vincenzo Cardarelli: 'Autunno veneziano', in: Manfred Lentzen (Hg.), Italienische. Lyrik in Einzelinterpretationen, Berlin (E. Schmidt) 1999, S. 79 – 87

External links

1887 births
1959 deaths
People from the Province of Viterbo
20th-century Italian male writers
Italian male journalists
Italian male poets
Strega Prize winners
20th-century Italian poets
20th-century Italian journalists